The Iranian Club Dubai is a social club complex located in the Oud Metha area of Dubai, United Arab Emirates. It is funded by the Iranian government and is run by the Iranian community in Dubai.

Background
The club was inaugurated in 1990 by Sheikh Rashid Al Maktoum as a venue for showcasing Iranian cultural activities, and is funded by the Mostazafan Foundation, a semi-government organization in Iran. Spread over an area of 50,000 square feet, the club is non-profit and is open to both Iranians and non-Iranians. As of 2002, non-Iranian membership stood up to 5,000, while the number of Iranian members was twice as much. Acquiring club membership is free, with members only having to pay for the activities facilitated by the club.

Facilities
The Iranian Club features a hotel with 22 rooms, an Iranian restaurant, sports facilities, and a theater and auditorium for cultural events. The club has a cultural department which organises cultural programs, and an educational department which provides language classes and arranges school-level activities. There is a library which hosts thousands of books in Arabic, Persian and English. Sports facilities include tennis, basketball and volleyball courts, swimming pools, a football ground, and gymnasiums. There are also two wedding halls. Events such as business conferences and graduation ceremonies are frequently held at the club. The club advises formal dress guidelines which must be adhered to.

See also

 Iranian Business Council - Dubai
 Iranian Hospital, Dubai
 Iran–United Arab Emirates relations

References

External links
 
 

1990 establishments in the United Arab Emirates
Buildings and structures in Dubai
Clubs and societies in the United Arab Emirates
Hotels in Dubai
Iranian diaspora in the United Arab Emirates
Organisations based in Dubai
Organizations established in 1990
Restaurants in Dubai
Sports venues in Dubai
Iranian association football clubs outside Iran
Iran–United Arab Emirates relations